Yūzaki Station (結崎駅) is a train station in Kawanishi, Nara Prefecture, Japan. It is on the Kintetsu Kashihara Line.

Lines 
 Kintetsu Railway
 Kashihara Line

Platforms and tracks

History
 Mar. 21, 1923—Yūzaki Station was opened by the Osaka Electric Tramway as the Unebi Line was extended from Hirahata to Kashiharajingu-mae Station.
 1941—Owned by the Kansai Express Railway that merged with the Sangu Express Railway.
 1944—Owned by the Kintetsu Railway that merged with the Nankai Railway.
 1998—The station building was renovated.
 Apr. 1, 2007—PiTaPa, a reusable contactless stored value smart card, has been available.

External links
 

Railway stations in Nara Prefecture